St. John's College of Arts and Science, is a general degree college located in Ammandivilai, Kanyakumari district, Tamil Nadu established in 2005. The college is affiliated with Manonmaniam Sundaranar University. This college offers different courses in arts, commerce and science.

Departments

Undergraduate
English
Mathematics
Physics
Computer Science

Postgraduate
English
Mathematics
Computer Science

Pre Doctoral
English
Mathematics

Accreditation
The college is recognized by the University Grants Commission (UGC).

References

External links

Educational institutions established in 2005
2005 establishments in Tamil Nadu
Colleges affiliated to Manonmaniam Sundaranar University
Universities and colleges in Kanyakumari district